Faouzi Bourenane (born 24 ,February  1994) Algerian football player who is currently playing for  AS Aïn M'lila in the Algerian Ligue Professionnelle 1.

Club career

References

External links
 

1994 births
Algerian footballers
Living people
1. FK Příbram players
People from Algiers
USM Alger players
AS Aïn M'lila players
Association football midfielders
Algerian Ligue Professionnelle 1 players
FC Sellier & Bellot Vlašim players
FK Ústí nad Labem players
Expatriate footballers in the Czech Republic
21st-century Algerian people